RashDash is a British feminist theatre company. The company was founded by Abbi Greenland and Helen Goalen. Becky Wilkie later joined. They have produced and created many works, including We Want You to Watch.

History 
Abbi Greenland and Helen Goalen formed RashDash in 2009 while attending the University of Hull. Greenland's parents were also theatre creators and participated in the political punk-theatre of the 1970s. While still students, Greenland and Goalen took a play called Strict Machine to the National Student Drama Festival.

The first play officially produced by RashDash was The Honeymoon, which centred on two women who had left their fiancés at the altar. Goalen and Greenland created the show with singer-songwriter Becky Wilkie.

Productions  

 The Honeymoon (2009)
 Another Someone (2010)
 Scary Gorgeous (2011)
 Set Fire to Everything!!! (2012)
 The Ugly Sisters (2014)
 We Want You to Watch (2015) – created by RashDash and Alice Birch, at the National Theatre
 Two Man Show (2016 and 2017)
 Snow White & Rose Red (2017)
 The Darkest Corners (2017) – as part of the Transform 17 festival
 Future Bodies (2018) – written by Clare Duffy, in collaboration with Unlimited Theatre
 Three Sisters (2018) – adapted from Anton Chekhov, co-production with Royal Exchange Theatre
 Don't Go Back to Sleep (2020)
 Look at Me Don't Look at Me (2021) – about Elizabeth “Lizzie” Siddal
 Oh Mother (2022) – written by Abbi Greenland and Helen Goalen, devised with Simone Seales, at HOME

Awards and nominations

References 

Feminist theatre
2009 establishments in the United Kingdom
Women in theatre
Theatre companies in the United Kingdom